The year 2004 in architecture involved some significant architectural events and new buildings.

Events
 January 28 – Transformation AGO: The Art Gallery of Ontario announces that Frank Gehry has designed a renovation and expansion of the gallery. Supposedly in the shape of an ice skate, the change is met with opposition by frequent benefactor Kenneth Thomson.
 March 24 – Demolition of the Brutalist Tricorn Centre in Portsmouth, England (1966) begins.
 June – Plans for The Cloud, a "Fourth Grace" at Liverpool Pier Head in England by Will Alsop, are abandoned.

Buildings and structures

Buildings

 March 16 – Ray and Maria Stata Center at Massachusetts Institute of Technology, Cambridge, designed by Frank Gehry, is opened.
 April 8 – ARoS Aarhus Kunstmuseum (art museum) in Aarhus, Denmark, designed by Schmidt Hammer Lassen Architects, is opened.
 April 28 – 30 St Mary Axe in the City of London (the Swiss Re building), designed by Norman Foster, is completed.
 May 1 – Europa Tower in Vilnius, Lithuania, the tallest building in the Baltic States (2004–present), is opened.
 May 8 – Forum Building, by Herzog & de Meuron, inaugurated in Barcelona during the opening ceremony of the 2004 Universal Forum of Cultures.
 May 23 – Seattle Central Library, designed by Rem Koolhaas and Joshua Prince-Ramus, is opened to the public.
 July 16 – BP Pedestrian Bridge in Millennium Park in the Chicago Loop, designed by Frank Gehry, is opened.
 September – Sharp Centre for Design, Ontario College of Art & Design, Toronto, designed by Will Alsop of Alsop Architects, is completed.
 October – Jazz at Lincoln Center performance venue in New York City, designed by Rafael Viñoly, is opened.
 October 9 – Scottish Parliament Building in Edinburgh, by Enric Miralles, opened.
 October 14 – Lewis Glucksman Gallery at University College Cork, Ireland, designed by O'Donnell & Tuomey, is opened.
 November 18 – Clinton Presidential Center, Little Rock, Arkansas, by James Polshek, is opened.
 November 20 – Expansion and renovation of New York's Museum of Modern Art designed by Yoshio Taniguchi.
 November 28 – Wales Millennium Centre in Cardiff, Wales, designed by Jonathan Adams of Percy Thomas Partnership, is opened.
 December 14 – Millau Viaduct, by Norman Foster, at Millau, France is opened.
 December 17 – .
 December 31 – Taipei 101 is opened in Taiwan, and remains one of the tallest buildings in the world.
 Netherlands Embassy in Berlin opened, designed by Rem Koolhaas.
 IT University of Copenhagen opens its new building in Ørestad, Denmark, designed by Henning Larsen.
 The Chongqing World Trade Center in Chongqing, China is topped out in a ceremony.
 30 Hudson Street, New Jersey, USA (the Goldman Sachs Tower), Jersey City's tallest building at 238 metres, is completed.
 Reconstruction of Nový Dvůr Monastery, Czech Republic, by John Pawson is completed.
 Reconstruction of Kingswood School, Dulwich, London, by De Rijke Marsh Morgan is completed.

Awards
 AIA Gold Medal – Samuel Mockbee (awarded posthumously).
 Architecture Firm Award – Lake Flato Architects.
 Driehaus Prize – Demetri Porphyrios
 Emporis Skyscraper Award – Taipei 101.
 Grand prix national de l'architecture – Patrick Berger.
 Grand Prix de l'urbanisme – Christian de Portzamparc.
 Praemium Imperiale Architecture Award – Oscar Niemeyer.
 Pritzker Prize – Zaha Hadid.
 Prix de l'Académie d'Architecture de France – Shigeru Ban.
 Prix de l'Équerre d'Argent – Antoinette Robain and Claire Guieysse, for the Centre National de la Danse de Pantin.
 RIAS Award for Architecture – Elder and Cannon Architects for St. Aloysius' College's Clavius Building, Glasgow.
 RAIA Gold Medal – Gregory Burgess.
 RIBA Royal Gold Medal – Rem Koolhaas.
 Stirling Prize – 30 St Mary Axe, London by Foster and Partners.
 Thomas Jefferson Medal in Architecture – Peter Walker.
 Vincent Scully Prize – Aga Khan.
 Twenty-five Year Award – East Building, National Gallery of Art

Deaths
 May 27 – Sigrid Lorenzen Rupp, German American architect (born 1943)
 September 12 – Max Abramovitz, American architect (born 1908)
 September 22 — Edward Larrabee Barnes, American architect (born 1915)

See also
Timeline of architecture

References

 
21st-century architecture